The men's 4 × 400 metres relay at the 2022 World Athletics Championships was held at the Hayward Field in Eugene on 23 and 24 July 2022.

Records
Before the competition, records were as follows:

Qualification standard
The standard to qualify automatically for entry was to finish in the first 10 at 2021 World Relays, completed by 6 top lists' teams.

Schedule
The event schedule, in local time (UTC-7), was as follows:

Results

Heats 
The first three in each heat (Q) and the next two fastest (q) qualified for the final.

Final

References

4 x 400 metres relay
Relays at the World Athletics Championships